Interface: A Journal for and About Social Movements is an open access academic journal that covers original research and reviews of books concerned mainly with protests, social movements, and collective behavior.

In 2017 Interface was listed as one of the "main academic journals" in the field of social movement studies, alongside Mobilization and Social Movement Studies.

References

Further reading 
 Cristina Flesher Fominaya, The Global Interface Project: Linking Sociology and Movement Activists, 16 February 2011, International Sociological Association
 Becky Lentz, Michel Bauwens, Launch of Interface Journal for knowledge sharing around social movements, 2 May 2010, P2P Foundation

External links 
 
 First editorial

Publications established in 2009
Open access journals
Sociology journals
Biannual journals
Works about social movements
Multilingual journals